Du Zuozhou (1895–1974) was a Chinese educator, writer and psychologist.

Biography
Du was born in Dongyang, Jinhua of Zhejiang province in late Qing Dynasty China. Du's courtesy name was Jitang (纪堂). Du graduated from Zhejiang Provincial No.7 High School (presently Jinhua No.1 Middle School) in Jinhua. In 1915, Du went to Wuhan and studied at Wuchang Advanced Normal College (武昌高等师范学校; later merged into Wuhan University). Du graduated in 1919 and taught for one year at the college.

In 1920, Du went to study in the United States. Du received master and PhD from the Iowa State University, Ames, Iowa.

Du was a professor and the Dean of the School of Humanities of Wuhan University. In 1928, Du started teaching at Xiamen University in Xiamen of Fujian province, Du was a professor at Xiamen for eight years. Du was a professor and became the university provost of Jinan University in 1937.

In 1943, Du was pointed the president of the National Yingshi University (国立英士大学; a root of current Zhejiang University) in Zhejiang.

After 1949, Du was professor of several universities in Shanghai and Fujian province. Du also was the chair of education psychology department of Nanjing Normal University.

Work
Du published numerous works in education and psychology in China. In 1930, Du published his book Education and School Administration (《教育与学校行政管理》) by the Commercial Press in Shanghai, this work first discriminated the educational administration (which is more governmental) and the school administration in morden China's educational system, and heavily influenced the later development of education in China.

References

External links
 Letters by Hushi to Du Zuozhou (antique collection)
 Brief biography of Du Zuozhou
 Archive of Soochow University: Du Zuozhou

1895 births
1974 deaths
Educators from Jinhua
Chinese non-fiction writers
Chinese psychologists
Iowa State University alumni
Republic of China writers
People's Republic of China writers
Writers from Jinhua
Academic staff of Wuhan University
Academic staff of Xiamen University
Academic staff of Jinan University
Academic staff of Nanjing Normal University
Wuhan University alumni
20th-century psychologists
20th-century non-fiction writers